A cooler, portable ice chest, ice box, cool box, chilly bin (in New Zealand), or esky (Australia)  is an insulated box used to keep food or drink cool.

Ice cubes are most commonly placed in it to help the contents inside stay cool. Ice packs are sometimes used, as they either contain the melting water inside, or have a gel sealed inside that stays cold longer than plain ice (absorbing heat as it changes phase). 

Coolers are often taken on picnics, and on vacation or holiday.  Where summers are hot, they may also be used just for getting cold groceries home from the store, such as keeping ice cream from melting in a hot automobile.  Even without adding ice, this can be helpful, particularly if the trip home will be lengthy. Some coolers have built-in cupholders in the lid.

They are usually made with interior and exterior shells of plastic, with a hard foam in between. They come in sizes from small personal ones to large family ones with wheels. Disposable ones are made solely from polystyrene foam (such as is a disposable coffee cup) about 2 cm or one inch thick. Most reusable ones have molded-in handles; a few have shoulder straps. The cooler has developed from just a means of keeping beverages cold into a mode of transportation with the ride-on cooler. A thermal bag, cooler bag or cool bag is very similar in concept, but typically smaller and not rigid.

History
The original inventor of the cooler is unknown, with versions becoming available in various parts of the world throughout the 1950s. 

The portable ice chest was patented in the USA by Richard C. Laramy of Joliet, Illinois. On February 24, 1951, Laramy filed an application with the United States Patent Office for a portable ice chest (Serial No. 212,573). The patent (#2,663,157) was issued December 22, 1953. 

In 1952, the portable Esky Auto Box was released in Australia by the Sydney refrigeration company Malley’s.  Made from steel and finished in baked enamel and chrome, with cork sheeting for insulation, the Esky became the first mass produced cooler on the market. The brand found huge success and by 1960, 500,000 Australian households owned one (in a country of approximately 3 million households at the time). 

The Coleman Company popularized the cooler within the USA with its initial offering of a galvanized cooler in 1954. Three years later, Coleman developed a process to make a plastic liner for coolers and jugs.

Thermoelectric coolers
Some modern coolers are thermoelectric, plugging into a car's cigarette lighter socket. Rather than using a compressor and refrigerant such as a refrigerator or other heat pump, these use the Peltier effect along with an external fan to draw away the heat. By reversing the current, this concept can also heat the contents instead of cooling them, useful for keeping meals hot from a drive-through, or even to keep items from freezing in severely cold climates.

Thermoelectric coolers typically can drop the temperature by about 40 °F or 22 °C below ambient temperature, or can raise it by at least that much; this is really a function of the effectiveness of the boxes' thermal insulation. Some better units even have digital thermostat controls. They do draw a significant amount of power, however, and can drain a non running car's battery so much so that it cannot start. Most electric coolers have an undervoltage shutoff at around 10 or 10.5 volts to prevent this. Many come with power adapters, which use an electronic transformer to convert AC mains or line voltage down to 12 volts, with a lighter-like socket for the cooler's cord to plug in. Some also have a crossover-connection device to reverse the current for heating service.

Rotationally molded coolers

Rotationally molded (roto-molded) coolers have become popular in recent years. Roto-molded coolers are manufactured using a process called rotational molding, a process by which a heated and softened material is applied to the inner wall of a slowly rotating mold. The mold continues to rotate during the cooling phase, producing a thick and uniform final product. In the case of roto-molded coolers, the heated liquid plastic is applied over a thick layer of insulation. The resulting product has no seals or imperfections and is much stronger and more durable than traditional coolers. Examples of roto-molded coolers include YETI, ORCA or Grizzly coolers.

Ride-on coolers 
A ride-on cooler is a means of transportation that can store and cool beverages and other food products. It is a combination of a low power engine with a go-cart frame which uses the cooler as a seat. The ride-on cooler has the ability to transport food and drinks short distances and can be used in a small backyard, a neighborhood, or at large outdoor parties. The ride-on cooler can be equipped with a trailer hitch, allowing it to tow an extra cooler as a trailer. 

Designs use either gas-powered lawnmower engines or electric motors which are lighter, more energy efficient, and quieter. Both can have a wide range of power.

The legal status of the ride-on cooler varies from country to country and in the US from state to state. In some jurisdictions, a driver's license is required to operate any form of motor vehicle on public roads, and a driver can be convicted of driving under the influence for riding one.

See also
Insulated shipping container
 Beer koozie
 Vacuum flask (Thermos)
 MOKON
 Cellarette
Coolgardie safe

References

11. EVERUN COOLERS丨explore fun in nature

External links

Food preservation
Food storage containers
 

fr:Glacière